Ethnogenesis is "the formation and development of an ethnic group".
This can originate by group self-identification or by outside identification.

The term ethnogenesis was originally a mid-19th century neologism that was later introduced into 20th-century academic anthropology. In that context, it refers to the observable phenomenon of the emergence of new social groups that are identified as having a cohesive identity, i.e. an "ethnic group" in anthropological terms. Relevant social sciences not only observe this phenomenon but search for explanation of its causes. The term ethnogeny is also used as a variant of ethnogenesis.

Passive or active ethnogenesis
Ethnogenesis can occur passively or actively.

A passive ethnogenesis is an unintended outcome, which involves the spontaneous emergence of various markers of group identity, through processes such as the group's interaction with unique elements of their physical environment, cultural divisions (such as dialect and religious denomination), migrations and other processes. A founding myth of some kind often emerges as part of this process.

Active ethnogenesis is deliberate, direct planning and engineering of a separate, identity.  This is a controversial topic, because of the difficulty involved in creating a new ethnic identity. However, it is clear that active ethnogenesis may augment passive ethnogenesis. Active ethnogenesis is usually inspired by emergent political issues, such as a perceived, long-term, structural economic imbalance between regions, or a perceived discrimination against elements of a local culture (e.g. as a result of promotion of a single dialect as a standard language at the national level). With regard to the latter, since the late 18th century, such attempts have often been related to promotion (or perceived demotion) of a particular dialect; nascent nationalists have often attempted to establish a particular dialect (or group of dialects) as a separate language, encompassing a "national literature", out of which a founding myth may be extracted and promoted.

In the 19th and 20th centuries, societies challenged by the obsolescence of those narratives which previously afforded them coherence have fallen back on ethnic or racial narratives as a means of maintaining or reaffirming their collective identity, or polis.

Inclusive or exclusive nationalism 

Ethnogenesis can be promoted to include or exclude any ethnic minority living within a certain country. In France, the integrationalist policy of the French Republic was inclusive; their laws stated all persons born or legally residing in France proper (including overseas departments and territories) were "Frenchmen". The law did not make any ethnic distinctions nor racial categories in between the "French" people. All people in France were Frenchmen and became citizens of the French Republic as far the country's law was concerned.

Language revival
Language has been a critical asset for authenticating ethnic identities. The process of reviving an antique ethnic identity often poses an immediate language challenge, as obsolescent languages lack expressions for contemporary experiences. In Europe in the 1990s, examples of proponents of ethnic revivals were from Celtic fringes in Wales and nationalists in the Basque Country. Activists' attempts since the 1970s to revive the Occitan language in Southern France are a similar example.

Similarly, in the 19th century, the Fennoman Grand Duchy of Finland aimed to raise the Finnish language from peasant-status to the position of an official national language, which had been only Swedish for some time. The Fennoman also founded the Finnish Party to pursue their nationalist aims. The publication in 1835 of the Finnish national epic, Kalevala, was a founding stone of Finnish nationalism and ethnogenesis. Finnish was recognized as the official language of Finland only in 1892. Fennomans were opposed by the Svecomans, headed by Axel Olof Freudenthal (1836–1911). He supported continuing the use of Swedish as the official language; it had been a minority language used by the educated elite in government and administration. In line with contemporary scientific racism theories, Freudenthal believed that Finland had two races, one speaking Swedish and the other Finnish. The Svecomans claimed that the Swedish Germanic race was superior to the majority Finnish people. In Ireland, revival of the Irish language and the creation of an Irish national literature was part of the attempted reclaimation of an Irish identity, beginning at the end of the nineteenth century.

Language has been an important and divisive political force in Belgium between the Dutch and Germanic Flemings and Franco-Celtic Walloons since the kingdom was created in 1831. Switzerland is divided among Alemannic German-speaking or Deutschschweizer against the French-speaking Romands or Arpitians, and the Italian/Lombard and Romansh-speaking minorities in the south and east.

Religion

The set of cultural markers that accompanies each of the major religions may become a component of distinct ethnic identities, but they almost never exist in isolation. Ethnic definitions are subject to change over time, both within and outside groups. For example, 19th-century Europeans classified Arabs and Jews as one 'ethnic' bloc, the Semites or Hamites. Later, the term Hamites came to be associated with Sub-Saharan Africans instead.

Christian, Muslim, Jewish, and Hindu followers have historically been aligned with ethnicities (and later nations) speaking different languages and having different cultures that arise on the basis of the languages that followers of each religion historically favoured: (Latin and Greek, Arabic, Hebrew and Sanskrit respectively). The sources of religious differentiation are contested among sociologists and among anthropologists, as much as between the faith groups themselves.

The line between a well-defined religious sect and a discrete ethnicity cannot always be sharply defined. Sects that most observers would accept as constituting a separate ethnicity usually have, as a minimum, a firm set of rules related to maintenance of endogamy, censuring those who 'marry out' or who fail to raise their children in the proper faith. Examples might include the Jews, Amish, Druze, Mormons, Sikhs, Maronites, Yezidis and Zoroastrians.

Geography
Geographical factors can lead to both cultural and genetic isolation from larger human societies. Groups which settle remote habitats and intermarry over generations will acquire distinctive cultural and genetic traits, evolving from cultural continuity and through interaction with their unique environmental circumstances. Ethnogenesis in these circumstances typically results in an identity that is less value-laden than one forged in contradistinction to competing populations. Particularly in pastoral mountain peoples, social organization tends to hinge primarily on familial identification, not a wider collective identity.

Specific cases

Ancient Greeks
Anthony D. Smith notes that in general there is a lack of evidence which hampers the assessment of existence of nations or nationalisms in antiquity. The two cases where more evidence exists are those of ancient Greece and Israel. In Ancient Greece, a cultural rather than political unity is observed. Yet, there were ethnic divisions within the wider Hellenic ethnic community, mainly the divisions between Ionians, Aeolians, Boeotians and Dorians. These groups were further divided into city-states. Smith postulates that there is no more than a semblance of nationalism in ancient Greece.

Jonathan M. Hall's work “Ethnic Identity in Greek Antiquity” (1997), was acclaimed as the first full-length modern study on Ancient Greek ethnicity. According to Hall, Ancient Greek ethnic identity was much based on kinship, descent and genealogy, which was reflected in elaborate genealogy myths. In his view, genealogy is the most fundamental way any population defines itself as an ethnic group. There was a change in the way Greeks constructed their ethnic identity in the Persian Wars period (first half of 5th c BC). Before that (archaic period), Greeks tended to attach themselves to one another by a process of genealogical assimilation. After the Persian invasion, they tended to define themselves against the enemy they perceived as the barbarian “other”. Hall believes that Hellenic identity was clearly envisaged in the 6th c. BC as being ethnic in character, cultural forms of identification emerged in the 5th century, and there is evidence that by the 4th century this identity was conceived more in cultural terms.

Jews 
In classical antiquity, Jewish, Greek and Roman authors frequently referred to the Jewish people in classical antiquity as an ethnos, one of the numerous ethne that lived in the Greco-Roman world. Van Maaren demonstrates why ancient Jews may be regarded as an ethnic group in current terms by using the six characteristics that co-ethnics share as established by Hutchinson and Smith. (1) the usage of several ethnonyms to refer to the Jewish ethnos, including "Jews", "Israel" and "Hebrews"; (2) Jews believed they shared a common ancestor as descendants of patriarch Jacob/Israel, and the Hasmonean dynasty (which controlled Judea between 140 and 37 BCE) employed the perceived common descent from Abraham to broaden definitions of Jewishness in their era; (3) historical events and heroes narrated in the Hebrew Bible and later scriptures served as a fundamental collection of shared memories of the past, and their community reading at synagogues helped instill the collective Jewish identity; (4) a shared culture including the religion of Judaism, worship of the God of Israel, Sabbath observance, kashrut, and the symbolic significance of the Hebrew language, even for Jews who did not speak it at the time; (5) a connection to the Land of Israel, Judaea or Palaestina as their homeland to both local Jews and those residing abroad; (6) a sense of solidary between Jews, on the part of at least some sections of the ethnic group, as shown for example during the Jewish-Roman wars.

Goths 
Herwig Wolfram offers "a radically new explanation of the circumstances under which the Goths were settled in Gaul, Spain and Italy". Since "they dissolved at their downfall into a myth accessible to everyone" at the head of a long history of attempts to lay claim to a "Gothic" tradition, the ethnogenesis by which disparate bands came to self-identify as "Goths" is of wide interest and application. The problem is in extracting a historical ethnography from sources that are resolutely Latin and Roman-oriented.

Indigenous peoples of southwestern North America 
With the arrival of the Spanish in southwestern North America, the Native Americans of the Jumano cultural sphere underwent social changes partly in reaction, which spurred their ethnogenesis, Clayton Anderson has observed. Ethnogenesis in the Texas Plains and along the coast took two forms: a disadvantaged group identified with a stronger group and became absorbed into it, on the one hand, and on the other hand, cultural institutions were modified and in a sense reinvented. The 17th-century Jumano disintegration, a collapse in part by the widespread deaths from introduced diseases, was followed by their reintegration as Kiowa, Nancy Hickerson has argued. Exterior stresses that produced ethnogenetic shifts preceded the arrival of the Spanish and their horse culture: recurring cycles of drought had previously forced non-kin to band together or to disband and mobilize. Intertribal hostilities forced weaker groups to associate with stronger ones.

Indigenous peoples of southeastern North America
From 1539 to 1543, a Spanish expedition led by Hernando de Soto departed Cuba for Florida and the American Southeast. Although asked to practice restraint, Soto led 600 men on a violent rampage through present-day Florida, Georgia, South Carolina, North Carolina, Tennessee, Alabama, Mississippi, Arkansas, and East Texas. Frustrated with not finding gold or silver in the areas suspected to contain such valuable materials, they destroyed villages and decimated native populations. Despite his death in 1542, Soto's men continued their expedition until 1543 when about half of their original force reached Mexico. Their actions introduced European diseases that further weakened native populations. The population collapse forced natives to relocate from their cities into the countryside, where smaller villages and new political structures developed, replacing the older chiefdom models of tribal governance. By 1700, the major tribal settlements Soto and his men had encountered were no more. Smaller tribes began to form loose confederations of smaller, more autonomous villages. From that blending of many tribes, ethnogenesis led to the emergence of new ethnic groups and identities for the consolidated natives who had managed to survive the invasion of European people, animals, and diseases. After 1700, most North American Indian "tribes" were relatively new composite groups formed by these refugees who were trying to cope with massive epidemics and violence brought by the Europeans who were exploring the area.

Indigenous peoples on the Canadian prairies
European encroachment caused large demographic shifts in the size and geographic distribution of the indigenous communities, leading to a rise in mortality rates due to conflict and disease. Some Aboriginal groups were destroyed, while new groups emerged from the cultural interface of pre-existing groups. One example of this ethnogenesis is the Métis people.

Moldovan 
The separate Moldovan ethnic identification was promoted under Soviet rule when the Soviet Union set up an autonomous Moldavian Autonomous Soviet Socialist Republic in 1924. It was set apart from the Ukrainian SSR on part of the territory between the Dniester and Southern Bug rivers (Transnistria). The scholar Charles King concluded that this action was in part a prop to Soviet propaganda and help for a potential communist revolution in Romania. At first, a Moldovan ethnicity supported territorial claims to the then-Romanian territories of Bessarabia and Northern Bukovina. The claims were based on the fact that the territory of eastern Bessarabia with Chisinau had belonged to the Russian Empire between 1812 and 1918. After having been for 500 years part of the Romanian Principality of Moldova, Russia was awarded the East of Moldova as a recompensation for its losses during the Napoleonic Wars; this was the beginning of the 100 years Russian history in East Moldova. After the Soviet occupation of the two territories in 1940, potential reunification claims were offset by the Moldavian Soviet Socialist Republic. At the establishment of the Moldavian ASSR, Chișinău was named its capital, a role which it continued to play after the formation of the Moldavian SSR in 1940.

The recognition of Moldovans as a separate ethnicity, distinct from Romanians, remains today a controversial subject. On one side, the Moldovan Parliament adopted in 2003 "The Concept on National Policy of the Republic of Moldova", which states that Moldovans and Romanians are two distinct peoples and speak two different languages, Romanians form an ethnic minority in Moldova, and the Republic of Moldova is the legitimate successor to the Principality of Moldavia. However, Moldovans are recognized as a distinct ethnic group only by former Soviet states.

Moreover, in Romania, people from Wallachia and Transylvania call the Romanians inhabiting western Moldavia, now part of Romania, as Moldovans. People in Romanian Moldova call themselves Moldovans, as subethnic denomination, and Romanians, as ethnic denomination (like Kentish and English for English people living in Kent). Romanians from Romania call the Romanians of the Republic of Moldova Bessarabians, as identification inside the subethnic group, Moldovans as subethnic group and Romanians as ethnic group. The subethnic groups referred to here are historically connected to independent Principalities. The Principality of Moldavia/Moldova founded in 1349 had various extensions between 1349 and 1859 and comprised Bucovina and Bessarabia as regional subdivisions. That way, Romanians of southern Bukovina (today part of Romania and formerly part of the historical Moldova) are called Bukovinians, Moldovans and Romanians.

In the 2004 Moldovan Census, of the 3,383,332 people living in Moldova, 16.5% (558,508) chose Romanian as their mother tongue, and 60% chose Moldovan. While 40% of all urban Romanian/Moldovan speakers indicated Romanian as their mother tongue, in the countryside, barely one out of seven Romanian/Moldovan speakers indicated Romanian as their mother tongue.

Italian

In Italy, after the differentiation of the Italo-Dalmatian languages from Latin in the Middle Ages started to distinguish Italians from neighboring ethnic groups in the former Roman Empire, there were ethnological and linguistic differences between regional groups, from the Lombardians of the North to the Sicilians of the south. Mountainous terrain had allowed the development of relatively isolated communities and numerous dialects and languages before Italian unification in the 19th century.

Singaporean
In Singapore, most of its country's policies has been focused on the cohesion of its citizens into a united Singaporean national identity. Singapore's cultural norms, psyche and traditions has led to the classification of "Singaporean" as a unique ethnocultural and socioethnic group that are distinct from its neighboring countries.

In 2013, Singapore's prime minister Lee Hsien Loong stated that "apart from numbers, that a strong Singapore core is also about the spirit of Singapore, who we are, what ideals we believe in and what ties bind us together as one people." According to a 2017 survey by the Institute of Policy Studies, 49% of Singaporeans identify with both Singaporean and their ethnic identity equally, while 35% would exclusively identify as "Singaporeans".

American
In the 2015 Community Survey of the United States Census, 7.2% of the population identified as having American ancestry, mainly people whose ancestors migrated from Europe after the 1400s to the southeastern United States. Larger percentages from similarly long-established families identified as German Americans, English Americans, or Irish Americans, leaving the distinction between "American" and specific European ethnicity largely as a matter of personal preference.

Black American/African American 
The trans-Atlantic slave trade brought West, Central, South, and East Africans into contact with Europeans and Native Americans. Ethnogenesis began from the first generation until 1865 in what is now the United States. Black Americans/African Americans have DNA and haplogroups spanning over five to six continents. Immigrants with African ancestry arriving after 1865 are not part of the Black American/African American ethnogenesis. Within the Black American population, there are no mono-ethnic backgrounds and mono-racial backgrounds are in the minority.

Historical scholarship
Within the historical profession, the term "ethnogenesis" has been borrowed as a neologism to explain the origins and evolution of so-called barbarian ethnic cultures, stripped of its metaphoric connotations drawn from biology, of "natural" birth and growth. That view is closely associated with the Austrian historian Herwig Wolfram and his followers, who argued that such ethnicity was not a matter of genuine genetic descent ("tribes").

Rather, using Reinhard Wenskus' term Traditionskerne ("nuclei of tradition"), ethnogenesis arose from small groups of aristocratic warriors carrying ethnic traditions from place to place and generation to generation. Followers would coalesce or disband around these nuclei of tradition; ethnicities were available to those who wanted to participate in them with no requirement of being born into a "tribe". Thus, questions of race and place of origin became secondary.

Proponents of ethnogenesis may claim it is the only alternative to the sort of ethnocentric and nationalist scholarship that is commonly seen in disputes over the origins of many ancient peoples such as the Franks, Goths, and Huns. It has also been used as an alternative to the Near East's "race history" that had supported Phoenicianism and claims to the antiquity of the variously called Assyrian/Chaldean/Syriac peoples.

See also
Historiography and nationalism
Nation-building
Y-DNA haplogroups by ethnic group

Notes

Kinship and descent
Race (human categorization)
Ethnicity
Ethnology
National identity
Origin hypotheses of ethnic groups